Bahubali is one of the Kevalis in Jainism.

Bahubali or Baahubali may also refer to:
Baahubali (franchise), a franchise that consists of two films and an animated series released as:
 Baahubali: The Beginning (2015)
 Baahubali 2: The Conclusion (2017)
 Baahubali: The Lost Legends (2017)
 List of Baahubali characters